Drillia clionellaeformis is a species of sea snail, a marine gastropod mollusk in the family Drilliidae.

Description
The shell attains a length of 22 mm.

The yellowish shell is longitudinally plicate, the plicae whitish, closely covered by revolving lines. The whorls are contracted and unilirate at the suture.

Distribution
This species occurs in the Atlantic Ocean off Angola at depths between 15 m and 35 m.

References

 Weinkauff, Conch. Cab., 2e édit., p. 106, pi. 23, fig-5 a, 5"

External links
  Dautzenberg (1912), Mollusques marins de l'Afrique Occidentale; Annales de l'Institut Océanographique

Endemic fauna of Angola
clionellaeformis
Gastropods described in 1875